The Aviation Cocktail is a 2012 independent American drama film directed by David R. Higgins and starring Michael Haskins, Brandon Eaton, Beau Kiger, and Leah Lockhart. The plot is about the entangled lives of three World War II veterans living in the Midwestern United States in the 1950s. The film's title refers to a famous drink, the aviation.

Plot
The film follows the lives of 3 three World War II veterans living in a rural midwestern town in 1958. It opens on pilot Jack Fisher (Michael Haskins), who gets a call from his sheriff brother Henry (Beau Kiger) with word about a suspected serial killer he has been tracking. They arrive to find the brothers' longtime friend Bob Halloran (Brandon Eaton), has a posse formed in a standoff with the suspect holding a young girl hostage in a barn. Once the posse discovers the hostage is dead, they unload bullets into the barn, injuring the suspect. The Fisher brothers and Halloran load the bleeding suspect into Jack's plane, but a decision is made during the flight that propels mounting tension between the 3 men.

A psychological aftermath unravels from the personal torment each of them deals with, as well as tensions from the estranged behavior of the victims' brother, Dale Riley, which leads to suspicions. As the story progresses, we see that the characters' idyllic family lives only disguise a reality of lies and betrayal.

Cast
 Jack Fisher as Michael Haskins
 Bob Halloran as Brandon Eaton
 Henry Fisher as Beau Kiger
 Alice Fisher as Leah Lockhart
 Connor Boyle as Dale Riley
 June Fisher as Katie Bevard
 Geoff Hadley as Mark Hanson
 Sam Fisher as Holden Mundorf

Production
The film's principal photography was in Valentine, Nebraska, and scenes were also shot in Colorado. Valentine was chosen as the primary location as an ideal setting for the story, but also because the city supported the production through the Economic Development Board, via Nebraska Senator Colby Coash's film incentive bill LB863, investing $5,000 for the $40,000 to $45,000 the production spent locally.

Release
The film was selected for screening at a number of North American film festivals, including its world premiere at the Calgary International Film Festival, September 21, 2012. In October 2012, the film screened at the Gotham Screen Film Festival & Screenplay Contest in New York, and in November at the Denver Film Festival, its Colorado premiere, where much of the cast and crew resides. In January 2013 it screened at the Trail Dance Film Festival in Oklahoma, and then in February 2013 in premiered in Valentine, Nebraska, where most of the film was shot. The Omaha Film Festival also screened the film in March 2013. The film is currently available on VOD and DVD.

Awards

References

External links
 
 

2012 films
Films shot in Nebraska
Films shot in Colorado
American independent films
2012 independent films
2010s English-language films
2010s American films